Robert Cooper (fl. 1402), of Canterbury, Kent, was an English politician and grocer.

Family
Cooper was the son of John Cooper, a woodman, of Canterbury.

Career
Cooper was a Member of Parliament for Canterbury in 1402.

References

Year of birth missing
Year of death missing
People from Canterbury
14th-century births
15th-century deaths
English MPs 1402